Robert Clyve Maynard (June 17, 1937 – August 17, 1993) was an American journalist, newspaper publisher and editor, former owner of The Oakland Tribune, and co-founder of the Robert C. Maynard Institute for Journalism Education in Oakland, California.

Biography

Early years
Maynard was one of six children to Samuel C. Maynard and Robertine Isola Greaves, both immigrants from Barbados. At 16 years of age, he dropped out of Brooklyn High School to pursue his passion for writing. Maynard became friends with influential New York writers James Baldwin and Langston Hughes and later acknowledged Martin Luther King Jr. as a hero.

Career
Maynard's career in journalism began in 1961 at the York Gazette & Daily in York, Pennsylvania. In 1965, he received a Nieman Fellowship to Harvard University and joined the editorial staff of the Washington Post the following year.

In 1979, Maynard took over as editor of The Oakland Tribune and became the first African American to own a major metropolitan newspaper after purchasing the paper four years later. He is widely recognized for turning around the then struggling newspaper and transforming it into a 1990 Pulitzer Prize-winning journal.

Maynard greatly valued community involvement. He taught at local high schools and frequently attended community forums. His positive, proactive outlook helped many in need, including children of cocaine-addicted mothers and earthquake and firestorm victims. Maynard used the outreach of his newspaper to better the community by pushing for improved schools, trauma care centers, and economic development.

The Robert C. Maynard Institute for Journalism Education
In 1977, Maynard co-founded the Institute for Journalism Education, a nonprofit organization dedicated to training journalists of color and providing accurate representation of minorities in the news media. For more than thirty years, the Institute has trained over 1,000 journalists and editors from multicultural backgrounds across the United States.

Personal life
The Institute he co-founded with his second  wife Nancy Hicks Maynard (1947–2008) was renamed in his honor after his death from prostate cancer in 1993. His daughter, Dori J. Maynard, later become president and CEO of the Robert C. Maynard Institute for Journalism Education.

Bibliography
 
 
 
 
 
 With Maynard, Dori J.

References

External links
 
 Robert C. Maynard Institute for Journalism Education official website
  C-SPAN interview aired on July 10, 1984

1937 births
1993 deaths
African-American journalists
20th-century American journalists
American male journalists
African-American publishers (people)
American publishers (people)
African-American writers
American broadcast news analysts
Elijah Parish Lovejoy Award recipients
Nieman Fellows
Publishers from California
The Washington Post people
Writers from New York (state)
African-American history in Oakland, California
20th-century American newspaper publishers (people)
Maynard family
20th-century African-American people